The 1983 UK Athletics Championships was the national championship in outdoor track and field for the United Kingdom held at Meadowbank Stadium, Edinburgh. It was the second time the event was held in the Scottish city, following on from the 1978 UK Athletics Championships. The women's 5000 metres race walk was restored to the programme after an absence at the 1982 event.

It was the seventh edition of the competition limited to British athletes only, launched as an alternative to the AAA Championships, which was open to foreign competitors. However, due to the fact that the calibre of national competition remained greater at the AAA event, the UK Championships this year were not considered the principal national championship event by some statisticians, such as the National Union of Track Statisticians (NUTS). Many of the athletes below also competed at the 1983 AAA Championships.

Three athletes, Steve Barry (men's racewalk), Martin Girvan (men's hammer throw) and Fatima Whitbread (women's javelin throw) took their third straight UK titles. Aston Moore defended his men's triple jump title, as did women's long jumper Beverly Kinch and hurdler Susan Morley. Kathy Smallwood-Cook and Buster Watson achieved short sprint doubles and Venissa Head won both the women's shot put and discus throw.

The main international track and field competition for the United Kingdom that year was the inaugural 1983 World Championships in Athletics. Women's UK champions Fatima Whitbread and Kathy Smallwood-Cook went on to reach the world podium.

Medal summary

Men

Women

References

UK Athletics Championships
UK Outdoor Championships
Athletics Outdoor
Sports competitions in Edinburgh
Athletics competitions in Scotland